Émile-Gustave Cavallo-Péduzzi (1851–1917) was a French pointillist painter, and part of the Groupe de Lagny art collective.

Life 

Cavallo-Péduzzi was born in Montmartre, Paris and studied at the École des beaux-arts, and in the studio of Jean-Léon Gérôme and Eugène Froment. He became a founding member of the Groupe de Lagny with Léo Gausson, Maximilien Luce and Lucien Pissarro, who painted in a pointillist style. In In 1899 he became a founding member of the Union Artistique et Littéraire du canton de Lagny.

He died in Lagny-sur-Marne in 1917.

See also
History of painting
Western painting

Webink 
Émile-Gustave Cavallo-Péduzzi on Arcadja.com

1851 births
1917 deaths
19th-century French painters
French male painters
20th-century French painters
20th-century French male artists
French Impressionist painters
19th-century French male artists